The Mycocaliciales are an order of ascomycetous fungi within the subclass Mycocaliciomycetidae and within the class Eurotiomycetes (subphylum Pezizomycotina).

References

Eurotiomycetes
Ascomycota orders
Taxa described in 2000
Taxa named by Leif Tibell